Leonidas Kyriakou (born 24 February 1998) is a Cypriot footballer who plays as a defender.

Club career
Kyriakou made his senior debut for Apollon in the last game of the 2016–17 season, playing 70 minutes in a 2–2 draw with APOEL FC.

Career statistics

Club

Notes

References

External links
 Leonidas Kyriakou at UEFA

1998 births
Living people
Association football defenders
Cypriot footballers
Cyprus youth international footballers
Apollon Limassol FC players
Cypriot First Division players